KZRS (107.9 FM) is a radio station licensed to Great Bend, Kansas.  The station broadcasts a classic hits format and is owned by White Communications.

History
As late as 2009, the station broadcast a hybrid Hot AC format during the day and Top 40 at night as “Star 107.9” (and was also an affiliate of the syndicated Bob & Sheri), then switched to classic hits as "Old School 107.9."

On September 16, 2020, KZRS flipped to a simulcast of then-sister station KNNS, which aired a conservative news/talk format as "The Patriot." As part of owner Rocking M Media's bankruptcy reorganization, in which 12 stations in Kansas would be auctioned off to new owners, it was announced on October 31, 2022 that Russell-based White Communications was the winning bidder for KZRS for $270,000. While the bankruptcy court has approved the purchase, the sale must be filed to the FCC for approval.

On January 2, 2023, KZRS and KNNS flipped to oldies, branded as "Super Hits 107.9 FM and 1510 AM". Upon the completion and consummation of the sale on March 15, White flipped KZRS back to classic hits, branded as "Classic Hits 107.9"; the first song on "Classic Hits" was "Start Me Up" by The Rolling Stones.

References

External links

ZRS
Classic hits radio stations in the United States